Nicholas Varney (born 1962) is a British businessman who was the chief executive officer of attractions operator Merlin Entertainments. He rose to this position in 1998 after a background in marketing.

Biography
Varney attended the London School of Economics before becoming a junior marketer in the mid-1980s, later progressing to senior roles. He has over 24 years experience in the visitor attractions industry and was appointed chief executive officer of Merlin Entertainments in 1999. He was later appointed a Director of the company on 20 October 2013.

Nick started his career in marketing, first with Rowntree and then with Reckitt Colman.  He went on to hold senior positions within The Tussauds Group, including Marketing Director of Alton Towers and Head of Group Marketing, before becoming managing director of Vardon Attractions and a main board director of Vardon.  In 1999, Nick led the management buyout of Vardon Attractions to form Merlin Entertainments and, in 2005, initiated the process which led to its acquisition by the Blackstone Group.

In 2011, he stated his belief that free admission to British museums and art galleries were primarily used by "foreign tourists and middle class people who can afford it." In business circles, he is widely seen as an aggressive marketer and was quoted in 2011 as saying "if you can get out of our attractions without buying tickets for the others, well, good luck."

In 2013 Nick Varney was awarded an honorary doctorate by Staffordshire University "In recognition of his considerable business success on a global scale."

On April 29, 2022, it was announced that Varney had informed the Merlin Entertainments Board that he intended to retire from the company. It was said that a search for a replacement would begin and Mr. Varney would turn over his responsibilities to the successor within 12 months.

Legoland

Having completed a management buyout of Vardon Attractions in 1999, Varney wanted to purchase the Legoland parks when they came up for sale. Varney wanted to invest but his current financial investors were not interested, and therefore Merlin was sold to the Blackstone Group for £110 million in 2005. Blackstone negotiated to buy control of Legoland for approximately £250 million, then merged it with the Merlin Group.  As part of the deal, KIRKBI AS, the investment arm of LEGO owners, took a share in Merlin Entertainments.

Gardaland
Under Blackstone in 2006, Varney wished to purchase an Italian theme park, namely Gardaland.

The Tussauds Group
In 2007, Varney arranged for the purchase and merger of The Tussauds Group, owner of the Madame Tussauds celebrity wax attractions, for £1 billion. After the Tussauds acquisition, Dubai International Capital, the owners of the Tussauds Group, held 20% of Merlin Entertainment.

The buyout and merger of The Tussauds Group was completed on 22 May 2007. With the completion of the merger, The Tussauds Group ceased to exist as a separate entity. The control of Madame Tussauds, London Eye, Chessington World of Adventures, Alton Towers, Thorpe Park, Warwick Castle and Heide Park were passed to Merlin.

On 17 July 2007, Varney executed a deal to sell the freeholds of Alton Towers, Thorpe Park, Warwick Castle and Madame Tussauds to private investor Nick Leslau and his investment company, Prestbury. Although these sites were purchased by Leslau, they continue to be operated by Merlin, with each site leased on a renewable 35-year lease.

Charity work
Varney and Merlin Entertainments established Merlin's Magic Wand in 2006. The charity believes in putting the magic back into the childhoods of seriously ill, disabled and disadvantaged children.

In July 2014, Brian House in Blackpool received a brand new minibus which transformed future outings for the hospice. Merlin's Magic Wand donated the specially adapted bus which was handed over by mascots from Merlin attractions: The Blackpool Tower, Madame Tussauds Blackpool and SEA LIFE Blackpool. The production costs of the specially designed carrier totalled over £50,000, with the vehicle being fitted with interactive features, including a DVD player, LED interchangeable lights and a Star Cloth ceiling in the hope of creating special and memorable experiences for young patients.

In March 2015, new sensory changing rooms, designed to ease disabled children into the swimming pool environment, were opened at Victoria Education Centre in Poole. The new facilities were created and funded by the charity and enable disabled students to adjust from the outside world to the swimming pool with interactive flooring and atmospheric lighting.

References

External links
 

1962 births
Living people
Alumni of the London School of Economics
English chief executives
Merlin Entertainments Group